

Flinders Ranges is a locality in the Australian state of South Australia located in the mountain range of the same name, about  north of the state capital of Adelaide, about  north-east of the municipal seat in Quorn and about  north-east of the regional centre of Port Augusta.

Its boundaries were created in April 2013, with the name selected in respect to the ‘long established local name’. Its southern boundary was altered in November 2013 with the addition of land from Hawker and the transfer of land to Shaggy Ridge. The sites of the government towns of Edeowie and Mernmerna are also within its boundaries. These town were both surveyed in 1863.

Flinders Ranges consists of the part of the mountain range between the ‘town centre’ of Hawker in the south and the 'town centre' of Parachilna in the north, as well as some land to the west of the range. In the north east it contains all of the protected areas of the Ikara-Flinders Ranges National Park and Bunkers Conservation Reserve, whose eastern boundaries align with that of the locality. The Marree railway line and The Outback Highway both pass through the west side of the locality while the Flinders Ranges Way passes through the south-east side.

As of 2012, its land use was either pastoral farming or conservation. The Marree railway line is the boundary between these uses, with pastoral farming to the west and land to the east zoned for conservation, including the Ikara-Flinders Ranges National Park and the Bunker Conservation Reserve.

Flinders Ranges is located within the federal division of Grey, the state electoral districts of Giles and Stuart, the local government area of the Flinders Ranges Council, the Pastoral Unincorporated Area of South Australia, and the state's Far North region.

Heritage listings

Flinders Ranges contains a number of places listed on the South Australian Heritage Register, including:

 Ajax Mine Fossil Reef
 Aroona Valley: Hayward Homestead Ruins
 Aroona Valley: Eddie Pumpa Outstation
 Brachina Gorge: Impact Ejecta Horizon Late Precambrian Shales Geological Site
 Brachina Road: Enorama Outstation and Mail Station Ruins
 Wilpena Pound Geological Landform
 Stromatolites in the Precambrian Trezona Formation, Ikara-Flinders Ranges National Park
 Wilkawillina Archaeocyathae Geological Site
 Oraparinna Diapir
 Tufa Waterfall
 Enorama Diapir
 Appealinna Mine Ruins and Miner's Hut
 Blacksmith's Shop, Oraparinna Station
 Dingley Dell Homestead Ruins
 Wills Homestead Complex Ruins
 Hill's Cottage, Wilpena Pound
 Wilpena Homestead Complex

Adjoining localities
Flinders Ranges is bounded by the following localities:
 Northwest: Motpena,
 North: Motpena, Mount Falkland, Alpana, Gum Creek Station and Agorigina.
 Northeast: Wirrealpa
 East: Wirrealpa, Willow Springs, Upalinna, Prelinna, Mount Havelock and Willippa.
 Southeast: Black Hill Station
 South: Barndioota, Hawker, Shaggy Ridge and Black Hill Station
 Southwest: Wallerberdina
 West: Motpena, Wintabatinyana, Lake Torrens Station

See also

St Mary Peak
Edeowie Station
Cazneaux Tree

References
Notes

Citations

Towns in South Australia
Places in the unincorporated areas of South Australia
Far North (South Australia)
Flinders Ranges